Mudal is a village in Bhudargad taluka of Kolhapur district in the Indian state of Maharashtra.

Demographics
As per 2011 census, population of Mudal village is 3487 of which 1806 are male and 1681 are female. Literacy of village is 69.88% against total population.

Transport
Mudal is connected to Kolhapur, Radhanagari and Nipani by highways.

References

Villages in Kolhapur district